William David Shores (May 26, 1904 – February 19, 1984) was an American professional baseball pitcher. He played in Major League Baseball (MLB) from 1928 to 1936 for the Philadelphia Athletics, Chicago White Sox, and New York Giants.

Shores was the first major league player to wear uniform number 13, while playing for the A's in 1931. The number 13 was not routinely issued to players, except by request.

External links

1904 births
1984 deaths
Major League Baseball pitchers
Baseball players from Texas
Philadelphia Athletics players
Chicago White Sox players
New York Giants (NL) players
Sportspeople from Abilene, Texas